Crescent Bay is a  under-construction upscale mixed-use oceanfront development in Defence, Karachi, Pakistan consisting of 50 towers. It is one of the biggest projects in Karachi, initiated by Giga Group Pakistan. A joint venture by EMAAR and Giga Group Pakistan - the project started with an aim to provide International standard lifestyle to the people of Karachi. Land reclamation on the project was completed by Mazyood Giga International a subsidiary of Giga Group with the help of Halcrow Consultants.

The development features 50 high and mid-rise towers for residential and commercial use, a shopping centre, a five-star beachfront hotel and a tower located in the heart of the project. The development includes approximately 4,000 residential apartments. Launched on May 31, 2006, when completed the development would be the first development with a private beach and also the first based on reclaimed land.

Even-though the development sold out in 2008, it faced significant delays, initially due to the liquidity crisis faced by Emaar Properties following the 2008 financial crisis. Later, due to a legal battle with DHA Ltd allegedly for breach of contract. The construction resumed in 2015 and is contracted to NESPAK. As of 2022, 38-storey Coral Tower (2 towers), Pearl Tower (3 towers) and Reef Tower (2 Towers) are complete. As of 2022, Residential properties are priced from 300,000$ to 600,000$.

See also
 Defence Housing Authority
Emaar Pakistan

References

External links
 Official Website
 Pakistan Defence Officers Housing Authority

Apartment buildings in Pakistan
Hotels in Karachi
Skyscrapers in Karachi
Defence, Karachi
Business parks of Pakistan
Shopping malls in Pakistan